Rear Admiral Barry Kennedy Atkins (August 2, 1911 – November 15, 2005) was an officer of the United States Navy best known for his achievements as a destroyer captain in World War II.

Atkins graduated from the United States Naval Academy in 1932, and was commissioned as a career naval officer.  He commanded the destroyer USS Melvin in the Pacific Theater of World War II, and received the Navy Cross for "extraordinary heroism" for action during the Battle of Surigao Strait in the Philippines. On October 25, 1944, the Melvin fired a torpedo at the Japanese battleship Fusō, setting off a chain reaction of explosions that sank the ship; according to Jack Green, spokesman at the Naval Historical Center, "the Melvin probably was the only destroyer to sink a battleship in World War II."

He retired in October 1959.

Admiral Atkins died on November 15, 2005 at age 94. He was buried at Arlington National Cemetery, in Arlington, Virginia, on January 30, 2006.

There has been pressure from crewmen of the Melvin to have a ship named after Atkins; the only official response has been that, as one prominent and highly decorated officer among many, he is eligible for the honor but not guaranteed it.

References

External links
 
  Portrait of a Shipmate – short biography of RDML Atkins

1911 births
2005 deaths
United States Navy personnel of World War II
Burials at Arlington National Cemetery
Recipients of the Navy Cross (United States)
United States Naval Academy alumni
United States Navy rear admirals (upper half)
Recipients of the Silver Star